The Serbian Hockey League Season for 2005-2006 consisted of 12 games. It lasted from November 15 to December 16. In the end HK Partizan won. HK Spartak Subotica eventually fell out from the competition because of various problems - mainly that they lacked an indoor arena.

Final standings
Standings including Spartak.

Standings, in the case that one does not count Spartak.

Playoffs

semifinals
 21.02.06 Beograd: HK Crvena Zvezda Beograd - HK Vojvodina Novi Sad
 22.02.06 Beograd: HK Partizan Beograd - HK Novi Sad
 24.02.06 Novi Sad: HK Vojvodina Novi Sad - HK Crvena Zvezda Beograd
 25.02.06 Novi Sad: HK Novi Sad - HK Partizan Beograd
 28.02.06 Beograd: HK Crvena Zvezda Beograd - HK Vojvodina Novi Sad
 01.03.06 Beograd: HK Partizan Beograd - HK Novi Sad
Partizn - Novi Sad - 6:3 (0:1,3:1,3:1)
Novi Sad - Partizan - 3:4 OT
Partizan wins 2:0
Crvena Zvezda - Vojvodina 2:4 (0:2,2:2,0:0)
Vojvodina - Crvena Zvezda 3:9 (1:2,1:4,1:3)
Crvena Zvezda - Vojvodina 6:0 (0:0,2:0,4:0)
Zvezda wins 2:1

finals
 Partizan - Crvena Zvezda 5:4 (2:1,2:2,0:1;1:0) OT.
 Crvena Zvezda - Partizan 1:3 (0:2,1:1,0:0)
 Partizan wins 2-0

Schedule and results
 15.11.05. Vojvodina - Partizan 3:3 (0:1,1:2,2:0)
 15.11.05. Crvena Zvezda – Novi Sad 7:5 (3:0,1:1,3:4) (friendly)
 18.11.05. Partizan - Spartak (odlozeno)
 18.11.05. Vojvodina – Crvena Zvezda 2:1 (1:0,0:0,1:1)
 22.11.05. Crvena Zvezda - Partizan 2:4 (1:2,0:0,1:2)
 22.11.05. Novi Sad - Spartak (odlozeno)
 25.11.05. Novi Sad - Partizan 2:6 (0:3,0:3,2:0)
 25.11.05. Vojvodina - Spartak 18:2 (5:0,5:2,8:0)
 29.11.05. Novi Sad - Vojvodina 2:4 (0:1,1:0,1:3)
 29.11.05. Crvena Zvezda - Spartak 22:2 (4:1,9:1,9:0)
 02.12.05. Partizan - . Vojvodina b.b. rolba
 02.12.05. Novi Sad - Crvena Zvezda b.b. trener
 06.12.05. Spartak - Partizan 0:24 (0:7,0:6,0:11)
 06.12.05. Crvena Zvezda - . Vojvodina 3:2 (0:1,1:0,2:1)
 09.12.05. Partizan - Crvena Zvezda 5:2 (0:0,2:1.3:1)
 09.12.05. Spartak - Novi Sad 0:17
 13.12.05. Vojvodina - Spartak 14:5 (5:1, 6:1, 3:3)
 13.12.05. Partizan - Novi Sad 9:3 (4:2,4:1,1:0)
 16.12.05. Spartak - Crvena Zvezda (odlozeno)
 16.12.05. Vojvodina - Novi Sad 6:2 (1:0,3:0,1:2)

Serbian Hockey League
Serbian Hockey League seasons
Serb